Civil War Times (formerly Civil War Times Illustrated) is a history magazine published bi-monthly which covers the American Civil War. It was established in 1962 by Robert Fowler due to centennial anniversary interest in the Civil War in the United States. The magazine was originally named Civil War Times Illustrated Magazine and based in Gettysburg, Pennsylvania. It focuses on both battlefield strategy and tactics and the social and economic conditions of the time, as well as the aftermath of the Civil War on the present.

Structure
Civil War Times has a number of recurring departments, including:

 Turning Points: Pivotal transitions in the course of the war. 
 Irregulars: Descriptions of the role of irregular branches on the war effort (engineers, recruiters, etc.)
 Civil War Today: Current news from the Civil War community 
 Gallery: Profile and picture of a reader's Civil War ancestor
 In Their Footsteps: Battlefield tour guides and points of interest
 My War: First-hand soldier diaries, letters and memoirs

History

Establishment
Fowler first introduced the publication at a Civil War re-enactment being staged near the battlefield at Gettysburg, Pennsylvania, and he has been a driving force for the publication.

2006 acquisition
In 2006, the Weider History Group, a wholly owned subsidiary of Weider Health and Fitness Inc, acquired Civil War Times in an acquisition of eleven history-related magazines from another magazine chain, along with America's Civil War, Armchair General, Vietnam, etc. These acquisitions caused controversies over a change in editorial direction, including the resignation of the Civil War Timess editor (Chris Lewis), and general criticisms of anti-Palestine bias. As of 2022, Civil War Times, along with its sister publication America's Civil War, is owned by the World History Group. In the summer of 2022 World History Group announced both titles would scale back to a quarterly publishing schedule.

See also
 William C. Davis (historian)

References

External links
 Civil War Times magazine site

1962 establishments in Pennsylvania
American Civil War magazines
Bimonthly magazines published in the United States
Magazines established in 1962
Magazines published in Pennsylvania
Magazines published in Virginia
Military magazines published in the United States